Melaleuca villosisepala is a shrub in the myrtle family Myrtaceae and is endemic to the south-west of Western Australia. It is a shrub with narrow leaves, heads of pink to mauve flowers that fade to white and is similar to Melaleuca wonganensis except that its heads of flowers are smaller and pinkish rather than deep purple.

Description

The flowers are pink or mauve and fade to white and from September to February.

Taxonomy and naming
Melaleuca villosisepala was first formally described in 1999 by Lyndley Craven in Australian Systematic Botany. The specific epithet (villosisepala) is derived from the Latin word villosus meaning "hairy" and the New Latin word sepalum meaning "sepal", referring to the hairy lobes of the calyx.

Distribution and habitat
This melaleuca occurs from the Southern Cross-Coolgardie districts, south to the Stirling Range-Ravensthorpe districts in the Esperance Plains biogeographical zone. It grows in  red-brown clay-loam, often in roadside remnant vegetation.

Conservation
Melaleuca villosisepala is classified as "not threatened" by the Government of Western Australia Department of Parks and Wildlife.

References

villosisepala
Myrtales of Australia
Plants described in 1999
Endemic flora of Western Australia
Taxa named by Lyndley Craven